David Abbott (March 8, 1902 – May 19, 1987) was an American long-distance runner.

Career
Abbott started his career while studying at University of Illinois, where he won an NCAA national championship in the two-mile race. He competed in the men's 5000 metres at the 1928 Summer Olympics, where he was eliminated in the preliminary heats.

References

External links
 

1902 births
1987 deaths
Athletes (track and field) at the 1928 Summer Olympics
American male long-distance runners
American male steeplechase runners
Olympic track and field athletes of the United States
Sportspeople from Providence, Rhode Island
Track and field athletes from Rhode Island
20th-century American people